Trimeresurus mutabilis is a venomous pitviper species endemic to Central Nicobar Island. Its common name is Central Nicobar pit viper or Central Nicobar bamboo pit viper.

References

mutabilis
Reptiles of India
Endemic fauna of the Nicobar Islands
Taxa named by Ferdinand Stoliczka
Reptiles described in 1870